Joseph Normand Stéphane Morin (March 27, 1969 – October 6, 1998) was a Canadian ice hockey player who played in the National Hockey League between 1989 and 1994 with the Quebec Nordiques and the Vancouver Canucks.

Early life
Morin was born in Montreal, Quebec. As a youth, he played in the 1981 Quebec International Pee-Wee Hockey Tournament with a minor ice hockey team from Saint-Leonard, Quebec.

Playing career

Morin played his junior hockey for the Chicoutimi Saguenéens. He was passed over in the 1988 draft, but following a monster season in 1988–89 in which he led the QMJHL in scoring with 186 points and won the Michel Brière Memorial Trophy for Most Valuable Player in the Quebec Major Junior Hockey League, he was selected 43rd overall in the 1989 NHL Entry Draft.

Morin turned pro for the 1989–90 season, and spent most of the season with the Halifax Citadels, where he performed well, earning a six-game callup to Quebec in which he picked up two assists. In 1990–91, he was called up mid-season and performed exceptionally well, notching 40 points in 48 games on a weak Quebec club to finish 4th in team scoring. However, this would represent the high-water mark of Morin's career, as he slid down the depth chart the following year and registered just 10 points in 30 games for the Nordiques, and found himself back in the minors for much of the season.

Released by Quebec, Morin signed with the Vancouver Canucks in 1992. He spent two seasons in Vancouver's system during which he dominated the American Hockey League with the Hamilton Canucks, but appeared in only 6 games for the NHL Canucks over that span, recording three points.

After leaving the Vancouver organization, Morin signed on with the Minnesota Moose of the International Hockey League. While Morin's skating ability was considered questionable and cited as the reason he failed to stick in the NHL, he was a gifted minor-league scorer with tremendous offensive skills, and he led the IHL in scoring with 114 points in 1994–95. He would spend four seasons in the IHL with the Moose and later the Long Beach Ice Dogs.

For the 1998–99 season, Morin signed in Germany with the Berlin Capitals.

Death

On October 6, 1998, in his 7th game with his new team, he was complaining of feeling unwell during the first period. Early in the second period, he collapsed at the bench as a result of heart failure, and medical staff were unable to revive him. He was pronounced dead at hospital, leaving a wife and newborn son, Frederick. An autopsy was performed and it was discovered that Morin had undiagnosed chronic bronchitis and an enlarged heart. It also revealed he had suffered an undetected heart attack in the past several years.

During his career, Morin appeared in 90 NHL games, recording 16 goals and 39 assists for 55 points, along with 52 penalty minutes.

Career statistics

See also
List of ice hockey players who died during their playing career

References

External links

1969 births
1998 deaths
Berlin Capitals players
Canadian ice hockey centres
Chicoutimi Saguenéens (QMJHL) players
Halifax Citadels players
Sport deaths in Germany
Long Beach Ice Dogs (IHL) players
Manitoba Moose (IHL) players
Minnesota Moose players
Quebec Nordiques draft picks
Quebec Nordiques players
Shawinigan Cataractes players
Vancouver Canucks players
Ice hockey people from Montreal
Canadian expatriate ice hockey players in Germany